Cellcom (officially called New-Cell Inc. dba Cellcom) is a regional wireless service provider based in De Pere, Wisconsin, with roots that date back to 1910. Cellcom began providing service from its office in Green Bay in 1987, when its parent company, Nsight, entered the wireless industry.

Cellcom offers a variety of wireless communication devices, including feature handsets, smartphones, home phones, tablets, residential and mobile broadband.
Outside of its own regional network, the company partners with other regional and national carriers to provide nationwide voice and data service. Cellcom uses CDMA and 4G LTE technology. Cellcom's retail area includes northeast and central Wisconsin and Michigan's Upper Peninsula.

History 
Cellcom's parent company, Nsight, was founded on March 10, 1910, when a group of Pulaski business people met at the local drug store to discuss providing telephone service to their growing community. From that meeting, the Pulaski Merchants and Farmers Telephone Company formed.

In 1968 the company's name changed to Northeast Telephone Company. Northeast Communications, Inc. was formed as a holding company in 1982, and Northeast Telephone Company became a subsidiary. In 1999, Northeast Communications of Wisconsin, Inc. began doing business as Nsight. Today, Nsight's subsidiaries include Cellcom, Nsight Telservices and Nsight Tower.

Nsight has been a family-run business since 1923.

Green cell sites 
The first alternative energy cell site in the upper Midwest, built in Ackley, Wis. and activated on April 22, 2008, delivers wireless service to an area that previously had many dead zones.

Equipment for the green cell site underwent rigorous testing prior to installation and features multiple backups to ensure continuity of service. The primary source of energy for this site is sunlight collected using a 6.3 kilowatt solar panel array. The energy gathered from the sun is converted into electricity and stored in batteries. The cell site draws energy for operation from these batteries. On dark or cloudy days, energy generated by a wind mill supplements the solar power to maintain operation. A hydrogen fuel cell serves as a backup for both of these energy producers. The final backup is a diesel generator that can be hooked up to maintain service if all other power sources fail.

In 2010, Cellcom converted the Ackley site to a grid-tie location and it now feeds the extra energy produced from the solar panels and wind turbine back to the power company and, in turn, became even more efficient.

A second green cell site was activated in 2009 on Chambers Island in Door County. The cliffs lining Door County's rugged shoreline were blocking the signals from mainland towers, leaving many area residents with limited cellular service, as well as leaving emergency personnel with limited radio coverage. The green cell site runs on batteries charged by solar panels at the base of the tower and a wind turbine installed on tower. A propane generator is available as a back-up source of power if there is inadequate wind or sun to charge the batteries.

Femtocells 
Cellcom was the first CDMA carrier in the U.S. to be a member of the non-profit organization founded in 2007 to promote worldwide femtocell deployment. Femto technology offers a low cost and highly effective solution to dead zones, particularly in small areas such as a home. In addition, a femtocell offers higher data rates, better voice quality and improved multi-media experiences.

In 2009, Cellcom received the first Femtocell Industry Award for significant progress or commercial launch by a small carrier at the Femtocells World Summit in London.

Network
700 5*5 MHz LTE
850 5*5 MHz CDMA
PCS 10*10 MHz LTE/CDMA 
AWS 1 5*5 MHz- Certain markets include 10*10 MHz LTE
AWS 3 5*5 MHz 

Cellcom is a Verizon LTE in Rural America (LRA) partner. Through this partnership, customers of both carriers will benefit from the high-speed, fourth-generation long-term evolution (LTE) services. 

Cellcom has access to Verizon Wireless's extensive 700 MHz and AWS 1 spectrum holdings for use on their network.

Cellcom has made plans to extend its 4G LTE infrastructure into almost all of its existing 3G CDMA network during 2016.

Other awards 
Cellcom and its parent company Nsight were recognized in 2009 as the business recipient of the Brown County Ethics in Business Awards.

Spokespeople 
The company has generally utilized head coaches and executives of the NFL's Green Bay Packers as their spokespeople, although due to Verizon's official wireless provider sponsorship with the league (along with the Packers having a gate provider sponsorship at Lambeau Field with Verizon, and an additional sponsorship with U.S. Cellular for stadium wi-fi and a showplace store in the stadium atrium), the team's logos and names cannot be used nor mentioned, and generic green and gold clothing is worn in ads instead.

Mike Holmgren was the first Cellcom spokesman from 1996 to 1999, followed by team president Ron Wolf in 2000, and Mike Sherman from 2002 to 2005. Mike McCarthy was featured in team advertising until departing the Packers in 2018, where McCarthy would come into situations and throw a challenge flag in situations where Cellcom was then compared more favorably to the national providers. In the fall of 2019, current Packers coach Matt LaFleur began to endorse the company in advertising.

The company has had two departures from Packer figures as spokesmen; Eli Mattson, a third runner-up in season three of NBC's America's Got Talent, promoted the brand from 2009 until 2010. With McCarthy's departure, the company had a more general advertising campaign promoting its locally based customer support, with Cellcom call center agents in their ads using local landmarks and songs to remind customers that they're based in northeastern Wisconsin.

References

External links
Official Website

Telecommunications companies of the United States
Companies based in Wisconsin
Mobile phone companies of the United States